Prepiella sesapina is a moth in the subfamily Arctiinae. It was described by Arthur Gardiner Butler in 1877. It is found in Brazil (Espírito Santo) and Bolivia.

References

Arctiidae genus list at Butterflies and Moths of the World of the Natural History Museum

Moths described in 1877
Lithosiini